A Toby jug is a type of human-shaped jug.

Toby Jug may also refer to:
 Toby Jug Nebula, a star system
 Lord Toby Jug (1965–2019), British politician
 Toby Jug, a 1960s Australian music group

See also
 Toby (disambiguation)